Albert Friedrich Schlotterbeck (January 9, 1909 – April 7, 1979) was a German author who wrote prose fiction, plays, and radio plays, and was a local leader of the German Resistance during World War II.

Biography 
Born in Reutlingen in the Kingdom of Württemberg as the son of a metal worker, he  joined the KJD, the German Communist Youth Party, in 1923, and the Communist Party of Germany (KPD) in 1927. He studied in Moscow from 1929 to 1930, returned to organize groups against the Nazis, and was arrested by the Nazi government. He was held in various Nazi concentration camps from 1934 to 1943, when he was released from the Welzheim concentration camp. He continued his anti-Nazi activities with the Schlotterbeck Group, but the group was captured by the authorities and deported to Dachau, where all captured members were summarily executed, including Schlotterbeck's entire family (except for a three-year-old girl) and his fiance, Else Himmelheber, on November 30, 1944. Schlotterbeck managed to flee to Switzerland.

After 1945 he led the Union of Persecutees of the Nazi Regime (VVN), an association of victims of Nazi persecution, in US-occupied Württemberg-Baden. He moved to Dresden in 1948 and was active in low-level political functions, but was removed from the SED, the Socialist Unity Party of Germany, in 1951, and imprisoned from 1953 to 1956. Author of an autobiography, Je dunkler die Nacht, desto heller die Sterne: Erinnerungen eines deutschen Arbeiters 1933-1945 (1945), and Im Rosengarten von Sanssouci (1968). His autobiography was translated by Edward Fitzgerald as The Darker The Night, The Brighter The Stars: A German Worker Remembers (1933-1945) (London: Gollancz, 1947).

References

1909 births
1979 deaths
People from Reutlingen
People from the Kingdom of Württemberg
Communist Party of Germany politicians
Socialist Unity Party of Germany politicians
Union of Persecutees of the Nazi Regime members

Communists in the German Resistance
German male writers